Striatin-3 is a protein that in humans is encoded by the STRN3 gene.

Interactions 

STRN3 has been shown to interact with:

 CTTNBP2NL,
 CTTNBP2, 
 FAM40A,
 MOBKL3, 
 PDCD10, 
 PPP2CA, 
 PPP2R1A, 
 RP6-213H19.1, 
 STK24,  and
 STRN.

References

Further reading